The International Figure Skating Competition was held in November 10-11, 1973. Medals were awarded in the disciplines of men's singles and ladies' singles.

Results

Men

Ladies

References

Rude Pravo Archiv, 12.11.1973, Page 7

Prague Skate
Prague